Balasamudram is a panchayat town in Dindigul district  in the state of Tamil Nadu, India.

Demographics
 India census, Balasamudram had a population of 12,281. Males constitute 51% of the population and females 49%. Balasamudram has an average literacy rate of 53%, lower than the national average of 59.5%; with 61% of the males and 39% of females literate. 10% of the population is under 6 years of age.

References

Cities and towns in Dindigul district